ASC Imraguens is a Mauritanean football club based in Atar, Mauritania the capital of the Adrar Region. The club plays in the Mauritanian top division.

In 1996 the team has won Coupe du Président de la République.

Stadium
Currently the team plays at the 2000 capacity Stade d'Atar.

Achievements
Coupe du Président de la République
Winner (1): 1996

References

External links
Soccerway

Football clubs in Mauritania